The siege of Kiev by the Pechenegs in 968 is documented in the Primary Chronicle, an account that freely mixes historical details with folklore.

According to the chronicle, while Sviatoslav I was pursuing his campaign against the First Bulgarian Empire, the Pechenegs (in all probability, bribed by Byzantine Emperor Nicephorus Phocas) invaded Rus and besieged his capital of Kiev (Kyiv). While the besieged suffered from hunger and thirst, Sviatoslav's general Pretich deployed his druzhina, his personal guard, on the opposite (left) bank of the Dnieper, not daring to cross the river against the larger Pecheneg force.

Reduced to extremes, Sviatoslav's mother Olga of Kiev (who was in Kiev together with all of Sviatoslav's sons) contemplated surrender if Pretich did not relieve the siege within one day. She was anxious to send word about her plans to Pretich. At last a boy fluent in the Pecheneg language volunteered to venture from the city and urge Pretich to action. Pretending to be a Pecheneg, he went about their camp, as if searching for a lost horse. When he attempted to swim across the Dnieper, the Pechenegs discovered his subterfuge and started shooting at him, but to no avail.

When the boy reached the opposite bank and informed Pretich about the desperate condition of the Kievans, the general decided to make a sally in order to evacuate Sviatoslav's family from the city, for fear of his sovereign's anger. Early in the morning Pretich and his troops embarked on boats across the Dnieper, making great noise with their trumpets. The besieged started cheering and Olga ventured out of the city towards the river. The Pechenegs, thinking that Sviatoslav was returning with his great army, lifted the siege.

The Pecheneg leader then decided to confer with Pretich and asked him whether he was Sviatoslav. Pretich admitted that he was only a general but warned the Pecheneg ruler that his unit was a vanguard of Sviatoslav's approaching army. As a sign of his peaceful disposition, the Pecheneg ruler shook hands with Pretich and exchanged his own horse, sword and arrows for Pretich's armor.

As soon as the Pechenegs retreated, Olga sent a letter to Sviatoslav reproaching him for his neglect of his family and people. Upon receiving the message, Sviatoslav speedily returned to Kiev and thoroughly defeated the Pechenegs, who were still threatening the city from the south. The following year Olga died and Sviatoslav moved his capital from distant Kiev to Pereyaslavets in present-day Romania.

References 

 Vasily Vasilievsky. Byzantium and the Pechenegs. St. Petersburg, 1872.

Kiev
Military history of Kyiv
Kiev
968
Kiev
10th century in Kievan Rus'
Battles involving the Pechenegs